Jonzac is a commune of the Charente-Maritime department, Nouvelle-Aquitaine, southwestern France. The historian Jean Glénisson (1921–2010) was born in Jonzac as well as the philosopher Jean Hyppolite (1907–1968)

Geography
The river Seugne flows northwest through the commune and crosses the town. The station of Jonzac has a direct connection the station Gare de Bordeaux-Saint-Jean.

Jonzac is located in the south of Charente-Maritime, with the department's capital La Rochelle 105 km to the northwest. The capital of the Nouvelle-Aquitaine region, Bordeaux, is 90 km to the southwest. 55 km to its east is Angoulême, capital of the neighbouring Charente department.

Population

See also
 Communes of the Charente-Maritime department

References

External links
 

Communes of Charente-Maritime
Spa towns in France
Subprefectures in France
Charente-Maritime communes articles needing translation from French Wikipedia
County of Saintonge